These are the team rosters of the 5 teams competing in the 2016 SEABA Cup.

Squads

References

References

References

References

References

References

SEABA Cup